Celebs Go Dating is a British dating reality series. It began broadcasting on 29 August 2016 on E4, with the first series having 15 episodes. Paul Carrick Brunson and Anna Williamson currently appear as the dating agents, with Tom Read Wilson as a client coordinator. Rob Beckett narrates the series. Following the conclusion of the eighth series, two special editions of Celebs Go Dating were commissioned due to the impact of the COVID-19 pandemic on television; Celebs Go Virtual Dating and Celebs Go Dating: The Mansion. The series has since resumed its regular format.

Development and production
It was announced in March 2016 that E4 had commissioned a new reality dating series which sees celebrities go on dates with members of the public. Filming for the first series started in August 2016, with the programme premiering later that month. The first series was made up of 15 episodes, airing every weekday. In 2017, a second and third series was confirmed to air in early and late 2017, with 20 episodes per series. Series two saw the return of Joey Essex who broke the rules in the first series when he started dating a celebrity on the series. During the filming of series two, Stephen Bear brought many problems to the dating agency, breaking the rules of the show by dating another celebrity outside of the series; this led to his removal from the programme.

It was announced on the official Celebs Go Dating Twitter account that the third series of the show will feature same-sex relationships for the first time. In September 2017, it was confirmed that the series would return for a fourth series in 2018. The fourth series also features same-sex relationships. The series was renewed for a fifth and sixth series in 2018. In 2019, the Celebs Go Dating was renewed for a seventh and eighth series. In June 2020, it was announced that due to the COVID-19 pandemic, the programme would return with a special series titled Celebs Go Virtual Dating. With five 30-minute episodes, the series began airing on 27 July 2020. The ninth series of Celebs Go Dating aired in early 2022.

Broadcast
The first and second series of Celebs Go Dating aired every weeknight on E4 with a repeat at the weekend on Sunday morning. The third series was due to end on 29 September 2017, however an episode that was due to be aired on 15 September 2017 did not air, seemingly pulled from broadcast moments before its scheduled starting time. The show's social media accounts even posted the trailer for the evening's episode hours before airing. An E4 spokesman cited "editorial reasons" and said the show would return the following week. In the fourth series, Celebs Go Dating began to air during the week and weekend, but there was no episode on Fridays or Saturdays. The Celebs Go Virtual Dating series was aired weekly on Monday evenings, marking it as the first time the programme had been transmitted weekly.

Series overview and cast

Series 1 (2016)
The first series of the show was confirmed in March 2016 and began airing on 29 August 2016. It concluded after fifteen episodes on 16 September 2016. Shortly after the first series, it was announced that E4 had commissioned a further two series to air in 2017. The following is a list of celebrities who appeared in the first series.

Series 2 (2017)
The second series of the show was confirmed on 7 November 2016, and began on 13 February 2017. It concluded after twenty episodes on 10 March 2017. Along with the announcement of the cast for the series, it was confirmed that Joey Essex would be returning, having previously appeared in the first series. Stephen Bear was also removed from the series during the eighteenth episode for breaking the show rules by dating a celebrity outside of the agency. The following is a list of celebrities who appeared in the second series.

Series 3 (2017)
The third series of the show was confirmed on 7 November 2016 along with the announcement of the second series, and began airing on 4 September 2017. It concluded after nineteen episodes on 29 September 2017. Bobby Cole Norris also became the first gay cast member to take part in the series. The following is a list of celebrities who appeared in the third series.

Series 4 (2018)
The fourth series of the show was confirmed on 28 September 2017, and began airing on 4 February 2018. It was the first series to have aired at the weekends, however there was no episode on Fridays or Saturdays. The following is a list of celebrities who appeared in the fourth series.

Series 5 (2018)
The following is a list of celebrities who appeared in the fifth series, which was broadcast from 14 October 2018 to 8 November 2018.

Series 6 (2019)
The following is a list of celebrities appeared in the sixth series, which was broadcast from 24 February 2019 to 21 March 2019.

Series 7 (2019)
For the first time in Celebs Go Dating, the series will feature couples, with Charlotte Crosby and Josh Ritchie receiving couples therapy as well as Jermaine Pennant and his wife Alice Goodwin. Katie Price and boyfriend Kris Boyson were initially revealed as part of the show in the cast announcement but due to conflict of interest on Price's behalf, they didn't appear on the series. The following is a list of celebrities appeared in the seventh series, which was broadcast from 5 to 29 August 2019.

Series 8 (2020)
The eighth series, along with the line-up, was announced on 20 November 2019. The series aired from 24 February 2020 to 19 March 2020. Midway through the series, Charlotte Dawson and Matt Sarsfield joined for couples therapy.

Celebs Go Virtual Dating (2020)
E4 announced that due to the COVID-19 pandemic, they would air a socially distanced series, titled Celebs Go Virtual Dating. The lineup for the series was announced on 15 July 2020. The series consists of five 30-minute episodes that began airing from 27 July 2020. The series was aired weekly.

Celebs Go Dating: The Mansion (2021)
Celebs Go Dating: The Mansion was announced on 25 November 2020, alongside the lineup. Unlike prior series, it was announced that the celebrities would be cohabiting together. The premiere date was later confirmed to be 25 January 2021.

Series 11 (2022)
The eleventh series was announced on 27 October 2021. The series launched in January 2022. According to dating agent Anna Williamson, Ryan-Mark Parsons received the worst score in Celebs Go Dating history and was put on hold from further dates.

Series 12 (2022)
The twelfth series was confirmed in August 2022 after cast members were spotted and photographed filming for the series. It will air in 28 November 2022. Love Island cast member Laura Anderson was scouted for the series "hours after" the end of her four-year long relationship with Dane Bowers.

Agents, psychologists and presenters

  = Agent/psychologist/presenter is a main cast member
  = Agent/psychologist/presenter is a recurring cast member
  = Agent/psychologist/presenter does not feature in this series
  = Presenter was a cast member in this series
  = Narrator features in this series

References

External links
 
 

2016 British television series debuts
2010s British reality television series
2020s British reality television series
British dating and relationship reality television series
E4 reality television shows
English-language television shows
Television productions suspended due to the COVID-19 pandemic
Television series by All3Media